Kozhino is a rural locality (a village) in Denisovskoye Rural Settlement, Gorokhovetsky District, Vladimir Oblast, Russia. The population was 21 as of 2010.

Geography 
Kozhino is located 26 km southwest of Gorokhovets (the district's administrative centre) by road. Melkishevo is the nearest rural locality.

References 

Rural localities in Gorokhovetsky District
Gorokhovetsky Uyezd